Leonardo "Léo" da Silva Moura (born 23 October 1978) is a former Brazilian professional footballer who played for several clubs including Fluminense, Flamengo and Grêmio. Mainly a right back, he also played as a midfielder.

Léo Moura previously played for Flamengo, for over ten years, where he was the team's captain, and Grêmio with whom he won his biggest title, the 2017 Copa Libertadores. He is famous being one of the few players who represented all four of the big Rio de Janeiro teams, Botafogo, Vasco, Fluminense, and Flamengo.

Club career

Early career
Léo Moura begun his footballing career at the youth division of Linhares Esporte Clube, acting as a midfielder. Still at the youth level, he was transferred to the Rio club Botafogo. Making his professional debut for the Botafogo team in 1998, Moura has transferred to Belgian side Germinal Beerschot where he played for one season. Afterwards, he has transferred to ADO Den Haag, then at the Dutch second division, Eerste Divisie, where he adapted to play as a right back and had a remarkable season.

Return to Brazil
On the second semester of 2001, he returned to Brazil and to Botafogo. Once there, Leo Moura sought a position as a midfielder, but lost it due to being sidelined by an injury. After his recovery, Leonardo switched to the role of right back, which suited him well and solved his club's lack of players for that role since César Prates's departure in 1999. However, Leo Moura surprisingly left Botafogo, moving to Vasco da Gama.

At Vasco, Leo Moura showed good chemistry with Romário and Euller, the attacking duo for the club. In spite of his success, Leo Moura decided to move to Palmeiras in 2002, a move which he regretted, as he was part of the Palmeiras squad that was relegated to the Campeonato Brasileiro Série B.

In 2003, he joined São Paulo FC, and due to the presence of another full back named Leonardo on the squad, Leonardo adopted the name of Leonardo Moura. After poor showings for the club, Leo returned to Rio de Janeiro, this time to defend Fluminense.

At Fluminense, he showed great potential and became a crowd favorite, once again playing with Romário, and playing by the side of his future teammate at Flamengo Júnior César. However, Léo Moura departed the club for Portugal's Sporting Braga in 2005, where he briefly stayed.

Flamengo
Joining Flamengo in 2005, Léo Moura arrived with certain suspicion from the fans, as he was known as a "nomadic player" who played for all of Flamengo's major rivals before. However, Léo soon made its mark for the Gávea club, being an important part of the squad and helping it avoid relegation. A skilled passer and dribbler, Leo Moura cemented his status as a key player for the Rio Club.

In 2006, the well-travelled Léo Moura won his first career title, the 2006 Copa do Brasil. With this victory, Flamengo earned a place at the 2007 Copa Libertadores after a four-year-long absence, and Moura cemented his place as a definite starter for the team. Falling at the good graces of the supporters of the club, Leo Moura formed a competent full back duo with Juan, a partnership which would last until Juan's departure from the club in 2010. Alongside the versatile midfielder Renato Abreu and the goalkeeper Bruno, Moura was one of the highlights of the squad.

In spite of a poor showing at the 2007 Copa Libertadores, Leo Moura had a good year in 2007, winning the Campeonato Carioca and being chosen by Placar magazine as the best right back of the season, winning the Bola de Prata award.

In 2008, after extending his contract with Flamengo, Leo Moura was called up to defend the Brazil national team in a friendly against Ireland. Moura was part of the squad which won the Taça Guanabara and the Campeonato Carioca, and was once again the winner of the Bola de Prata.

2009 proved to be a very successful year for the right back and a very memorable year for the rubro-negro team, as Flamengo went on to win its sixth Campeonato Brasileiro title. Leo Moura was an instrumental player for Flamengo's third consecutive Campeonato Carioca win, a feat that Flamengo has repeated six times in its history. 2010, however, proved to be a more tumultuous year for the club. Leonardo Moura earned his place as captain of the team after the club's captain, Bruno, was suspected of murder. Flamengo flirted with relegation throughout the year, staying dangerously close to the relegation zone in the league table, but it eventually reached the Copa Sudamericana qualifying zone by the final round.

Leo Moura's time for the Rio club seemed to be at an end in 2011, as he was hinted to join SC Internacional. The departure of his long-time partner at Flamengo's defense, Juan, reinforced the club's need for Moura to be on its team. Nonetheless, his time as the captain came to an end as the 2002 FIFA World Cup and 2005 Ballon d'Or winner and Brazilian international Ronaldinho joined the club, earning the club captaincy. Winning the 2011 state league title after winning both rounds of the competition, the Taça Guanabara and the Taça Rio, the Flamengo squad had great success at the first semester of the year, being a favorite to win the 2011 season of the Brazilian league. Flamengo mounted an impressive undefeated streak throughout the year, which was broken by Ceará SC in the Copa do Brasil quarter finals, and stayed unbeaten in the league season for 16 rounds, losing against Goiânia club Atlético Goianiense in the 17th round, on a match Moura played as a midfielder. However, Flamengo did not follow up in the second semester, barely earning a place at the next year's Libertadores by the end of the season.

Leonardo Moura's last game at Flamengo was on 4 March 2015, when he played a testimonial match against Nacional at the Maracanã, the right-back made one of the assists as Flamengo beat the Uruguayan side 2–0.

FC Goa 
In 2015, he signed for FC Goa, who at the time were under head coach Zico. He scored 2 goals and had 8 assists and was a crowd favourite. He helped his team to the finals of ISL and was one of the most valuable assets of the club. In the final, against Chennaiyin, he was injured and couldn't help his team win the 2015 Indian Super League.

Metropolitano
On February 2, 2016, Moura was announced by Metropolitano, from Santa Catarina, as their new player. He comes to club for playing League of Santa Catarina.

Santa Cruz, Grêmio and Botafogo of Paraíba
In second semester, Moura was appointed by Santa Cruz. In 2017, Moura was contracted by Grêmio. In both teams won many titles. In 2020, at 41 years old, he signed with Botafogo-PB.

International career
Leonardo debuted for the Brazil national team in a friendly match played in Dublin against Ireland on 6 February 2008, which they won by 1–0.

Career statistics

1South American competitions include the Copa Libertadores, Copa Sudamericana, and Recopa Sudamericana.

according to combined sources on the Flamengo official website, Flaestatística and Futpédia.

Honours
Flamengo
 Campeonato Brasileiro Série A: 2009
 Copa do Brasil: 2006, 2013
 Campeonato Carioca: 2007, 2008, 2009, 2011, 2014

Santa Cruz
 Copa do Nordeste: 2016
 Campeonato Pernambucano: 2016

Grêmio
 Copa Libertadores: 2017
 Recopa Sudamericana: 2018
 Campeonato Gaúcho: 2018, 2019

Individual
Campeonato Brasileiro Série A Team of the Year: 2007, 2008

References

External links

1978 births
Living people
Brazilian footballers
Association football defenders
Campeonato Brasileiro Série A players
Campeonato Brasileiro Série C players
Botafogo de Futebol e Regatas players
CR Vasco da Gama players
Sociedade Esportiva Palmeiras players
São Paulo FC players
Fluminense FC players
CR Flamengo footballers
Clube Atlético Metropolitano players
Santa Cruz Futebol Clube players
Grêmio Foot-Ball Porto Alegrense players
Botafogo Futebol Clube (PB) players
Belgian Pro League players
Beerschot A.C. players
Eerste Divisie players
ADO Den Haag players
Primeira Liga players
S.C. Braga players
North American Soccer League players
Fort Lauderdale Strikers players
Indian Super League players
FC Goa players
Brazil international footballers
Brazilian expatriate footballers
Brazilian expatriate sportspeople in the United States
Brazilian expatriate sportspeople in the Netherlands
Brazilian expatriate sportspeople in Belgium
Brazilian expatriate sportspeople in Portugal
Brazilian expatriate sportspeople in India
Expatriate soccer players in the United States
Expatriate footballers in the Netherlands
Expatriate footballers in Belgium
Expatriate footballers in Portugal
Expatriate footballers in India
Sportspeople from Niterói